Stanisław Karnkowski of Junosza (1520–1603) was the Great Referendary of the Polish Crown (since 1558), the Great Secretary of Poland (since 1563), bishop of Włocławek (1567-1580) as well as archbishop of Gniezno and Primate of Poland (since 1581). He served during the Interrex in 1586–1587, before the coronation of Sigismund III Vasa.

Karnkowski chaired the Sejm commission which prepared the so-called "Karnkowski's Statutes" approved by the Parliament in 1570. He was the only bishop on the election sejm to vote for Stefan Batory, who was suspected of being a secret Protestant. He opposed attempts of reforming the way of the election made by Jan Zamoyski and proposals of raising up taxes for the army.

Stanisław Karnkowski invited Jesuits to Kalisz and Poznań and founded the buildings that had to serve as centres of the struggle against Protestants in Greater Poland. Due to these activities, he was strongly supported by the king Sigismund III Vasa, the Jesuit complex was erected (1586–1597).

Stanisław Karnkowski is one of the personas on the famous painting by Jan Matejko: the sermons of Piotr Skarga.

References

External links
 Virtual tour Gniezno Cathedral 
List of Primates of Poland 
 Works by Stanisław Karnkowski in digital library Polona

Ecclesiastical senators of the Polish–Lithuanian Commonwealth
1520 births
1603 deaths
16th-century Latin-language writers
16th-century Roman Catholic archbishops in the Polish–Lithuanian Commonwealth
17th-century Roman Catholic archbishops in the Polish–Lithuanian Commonwealth
Polish political writers
Archbishops of Gniezno
Bishops of Kujawy and Włocławek
Polish interreges
People from Lipno County